The Centennial Conference is an athletic conference which competes in the NCAA's Division III. Member teams are located in Maryland and Pennsylvania. 

Eleven private colleges compose the Centennial Conference. Five of ten members of the Centennial Conference rank among the top 50 national liberal arts colleges and Johns Hopkins University is ranked seventh among national universities.

On average, Centennial members sponsor 19 varsity teams. Conference members have won seventeen NCAA team titles: Johns Hopkins women's cross country (2012, 2013, 2014, 2016, 2017, 2019, 2021), Gettysburg women's lacrosse (2011, 2017, 2018), Haverford men's cross country (2010), Franklin & Marshall women's lacrosse (2007, 2009), Ursinus field hockey (2006), Washington men's lacrosse (1998), and Washington men's tennis (1994, 1997).

History

According to the Centennial Conference's web site:  "On June 4, 1981, Keith Spalding, then-president of Franklin & Marshall College, made the announcement that "eight private colleges found it timely and appropriate to form a round-robin football schedule among institutions with similar attitudes and practices in intercollegiate football competition." With that statement, the Centennial Conference was born. Those private colleges were Dickinson College, Franklin & Marshall College, Gettysburg College, Johns Hopkins University, Muhlenberg College, Swarthmore College, Ursinus College, and Western Maryland College (later renamed and now known as McDaniel College).

The conference moved from a football-only conference to an all-sports conference after a 1991 feasibility study.  The study also recommended to expand from eight schools to eleven.  The other schools recommended were Bryn Mawr College, Haverford College, and Washington College.  Those three schools accepted and became charter members in 1992 as the conference expanded its sports offerings.

All of the charter members defected from the Middle Atlantic Conference (MAC). Johns Hopkins and McDaniel College both played in the Mason-Dixon Conference prior to entering the MAC in 1975.

Chronological timeline
 1981 - On June 4, 1981, the Centennial Conference was founded as a football-only league, then known as the Centennial Football Conference. Charter members included Dickinson College, Franklin & Marshall College, Gettysburg College, Johns Hopkins University, Muhlenberg College, Swarthmore College, Ursinus College, and Western Maryland College (now McDaniel College).
 1992 - The Centennial Football Conference became the Centennial Conference when the conference expanded to add other sports, effective in the 1992-93 academic year. Bryn Mawr College, Haverford College and Washington College also joined the newly-formed all-sports conference.
 1998 - Washington and Lee University joined the Centennial as an affiliate member for men's wrestling, effective in the 1998-99 academic year.
 2001 - Johns Hopkins left the University Athletic Association (UAA) to fully align with the Centennial Conference for all the sports being sponsored, effective in the 2001-02 academic year.
 2004 - The United States Merchant Marine Academy (Merchant Marine) and Stevens Institute of Technology (Stevens or Stevens Tech) joined the Centennial as affiliate members for men's wrestling, effective in the 2004-05 academic year.
 2007 - Juniata College and Moravian College joined the Centennial as affiliate members for football, effective in the 2007 fall season (2007-08 academic year).
 2010 - Susquehanna University joined the Centennial as an affiliate member for football and women's golf, effective in the 2010-11 academic year.
 2012 - New York University joined the Centennial as an affiliate member for men's wrestling, effective in the 2012-13 academic year.
 2016 - NYU left the Centennial as an affiliate member for wrestling, effective after the 2015-16 academic year.
 2017 - Susquehanna left the Centennial as an affiliate member for women's golf, effective after the 2017 spring season (2016-17 academic year).
 2017 - Marymount University and Neumann University joined the Centennial as affiliate members for women's golf, effective in the 2018 spring season (2017-18 academic year).
 2019 - Two institutions left the Centennial as affiliate members: Neumann for women's golf and Stevens for men's wrestling, effective after the 2018-19 academic year.
 2019 - Cabrini University joined the Centennial as an affiliate member for women's golf to replace Neumann's spot, effective in the 2020 spring season (2019-20 academic year).
 2022 - Washington and Lee University departed as an affiliate member in wrestling for their primary conference, the Old Dominion Athletic Conference.
 2023 - Football affiliates Juniata, Moravian and Susquehanna will depart for the new football league started in the Landmark Conference, effective after the 2022 fall season (2022-23 academic year).

Member schools

Current members
The Centennial currently has 11 full members, all are private schools:

Affiliate members
The Centennial currently has seven affiliate members, all but one are private schools:

Former affiliate members
The Centennial had four former affiliate members, all were private schools:

Notes

Membership timeline

Sports

The Centennial Conference sponsors championships in the following sports:

Men's sponsored sports by school

Notes

Men's varsity sports not sponsored by the Centennial Conference that are played by Landmark schools

Women's sponsored sports by school

Notes

Women's varsity sports not sponsored by the Centennial Conference that are played by Landmark schools

Current champions

See also
 Centennial Conference football
Centennial Conference men's basketball tournament

References

External links